Tredinnick is a Cornish surname. It derives from one of the places called Tredinnick; Tredinnick is formed from the elements "tre-" (homestead) and either "dynek" (fortified), "eythynek" (overgrown with gorse) or "redynek" (overgrown with bracken).

People
Notable people with the surname include:
 Alf Tredinnick, Australian rules footballer
 David Tredinnick (actor), Australian actor
 David Tredinnick (politician) (born 1950), British politician
 Mark Tredinnick (born 1962), Australian poet and writer
 Miles Tredinnick (born 1955), English musician, and stage and screenwriter
 Noël Tredinnick (born 1949), English organist and composer

Settlements
Places in Cornwall called Tredinnick or Tredinneck: Tredinneck (Madron); Tredinnick (Duloe, Landrake, Lanhydrock, Luxulyan, Morval, Newlyn East, Probus, St Issey, St Keverne, St Mabyn and St Neot)

See also

John Tredeneck (died 1566), English politician
Nick Tredennick, microprocessor designer

Footnotes

Cornish-language surnames